The 2010–11 Welsh Football League Division Two began on 1 September 2010 and ended on 28 May 2011. Ton Pentre won the league by 13 points.

Team changes from 2009–10
Caerau (Ely), Cwmbran Celtic and Penrhiwceiber Rangers were promoted to the Welsh Football League Division One.

Bettws, Caerleon, Dinas Powys, Ely Rangers and Ton Pentre were relegated from the Welsh Football League Division One.

Cardiff Grange Harlequins, Cwmbran Town, Llanwern, Porthcawl Town Athletic, Tredegar Town and UWIC were relegated to the Welsh Football League Division Three.

Aberbargoed Buds, Abertillery Bluebirds and Cwmaman Institute were promoted from the Welsh Football League Division Three.

Maesteg Park resigned from the league.

League table

Results

External links
 Welsh Football League

Welsh Football League Division Two seasons
3